This is a list of magazines that had been published by the Japanese publishing company MediaWorks, which has since become ASCII Media Works. Most of their magazines centered on anime, manga, bishōjo games, or video games. The vast majority of MediaWorks' magazines carried the title  which preceded the title of a given magazine; the Dengeki label was also used on publishing labels, and contests held by the company, making it a well-known trademark for MediaWorks.

Magazines

Active (1992–2008)

Special edition versions

Discontinued

Special edition versions

External links
MediaWorks' official website 

Defunct magazines published in Japan
Video game magazines published in Japan
Lists of magazines
 
Monthly magazines published in Japan
Defunct computer magazines